Nantuo Subdistrict is a subdistrict in Tianxin District of Changsha, Hunan, China.

Administrative division
As of 2016, the subdistrict is divided into one community and five villages: 
 Nantuoling Community
 Beitang
 Nantang
 Niujiaotang
 Sanxing
 Yanjiang
 Xingma

History
It was incorporated as a township in 1950. In 1955, it was merged into Muyun Town and came under the jurisdiction of Changsha County. On December 28, 2013, Muyun Subdistrict and Nantuo Subdistrict was established. On January 4, 2015, 

it came under the jurisdiction of Tianxin District.

Geography
It lies at the southern of Changsha, bordering Yuelu District to the west, Xiangtan to the south, Datuopu Subdistrict and Xianfeng Subdistrict to the north, and Muyun Subdistrict to the east. To the west, the region is bounded by the Xiang River.

The Xiang River flows through the subdistrict south to north.

Economy
The main contributors to the subdistrict's economy are commerces and manufacturing industry.

Transportation
 National Highway 107
 Nanhu Road
 Shichang Road
 South Furong Road

Gallery

References

Divisions of Tianxin District
Subdistricts of Changsha